Boris Ivanov may refer to:

 Boris Ivanov (athlete) (born 1947), Soviet decathlete
 Boris Ivanov (actor) (1920–2002), Soviet and Russian film and theater actor

See also
 Borislav Ivanov (born 1987), Bulgarian chess player
 Borislav Ivanov (karateka) (born 1977), Bulgarian karateka